Shaw's Corner was the primary residence of the renowned Irish playwright George Bernard Shaw; it is now a National Trust property open to the public as a writer's house museum. Inside the house, the rooms remain much as Shaw left them, and the garden and Shaw's writing hut can also be visited. The house is an Edwardian Arts and Crafts-influenced structure situated in the small village of Ayot St Lawrence, in Hertfordshire, England. It is 6 miles from Welwyn Garden City and 5 miles from Harpenden.

Built as the new rectory for the village during 1902, the house was the home of playwright George Bernard Shaw from 1906 until his death in 1950. It was designed by a local firm of architects, Smee, Mence & Houchin, and local materials were used in its construction. The Church of England decided that the house was too large for the size of the parish, and let it instead. Shaw and his wife Charlotte Payne-Townshend relocated in 1906, and eventually bought the house and its land in 1920, paying £6,220.

Shaw is known to have written many of his major works in a secluded, home-built revolving hut located at the bottom of his garden. The tiny structure of only , was built on a central steel-pole frame with a circular track so that it could be rotated on its axis to follow the arc of the Sun's light during the day. Shaw dubbed the hut "London", so that unwanted visitors could be told he was away "visiting the capital".

After Shaw's and his wife's deaths, their ashes were taken to Shaw's Corner, mixed and then scattered along footpaths and around the statue of Saint Joan in their garden. In 1967 the house was designated a Grade II* listed building.

Gallery

References

External links 
 
 Shaw's Corner - official site at National Trust
 Collection of Shaw's Corner - the art and object collections of Shaw's Corner

Arts and Crafts architecture in England
Buildings and structures in Ayot St Lawrence
Country houses in Hertfordshire
Biographical museums in Hertfordshire
George Bernard Shaw
Grade II* listed buildings in Hertfordshire
Grade II* listed houses
Historic house museums in Hertfordshire
Houses completed in 1902
Literary museums in England
National Trust properties in Hertfordshire